Leonard A. Groshek (June 13, 1913 – January 21, 1988) was an American teacher, farmer, and legislator.

Born in the town of Stockton, Wisconsin, Groshek received his teachers certificate at University of Wisconsin–Stevens Point. He was a teacher, farmer, retail merchant, insurance agent, and factory worker. Groshek served in town government. He served in the Wisconsin State Assembly as a Democrat. He died on January 21, 1988.

Notes

1913 births
1988 deaths
People from Stockton, Wisconsin
University of Wisconsin–Stevens Point alumni
Businesspeople from Wisconsin
Educators from Wisconsin
20th-century American businesspeople
20th-century American politicians
Democratic Party members of the Wisconsin State Assembly